Valeri Petrovich Yandemirov (11 February 1963 – 16 November 2017) was a Russian chess player.

Biography
Born in Kazan, Tatarstan, Yandemirov was awarded the titles of International Master, in 1993, and Grandmaster, in 1997, by FIDE. In the European Club Cup, he won three team medals: a silver, in 2006, and a bronze, in 2004, playing for team Ladya of Kazan, and a bronze in 1995 playing for Poliot of Chelyabinsk.

He died in his home on 16 November 2017.

References

External links
Valeri Yandemirov games at 365Chess.com

1963 births
2017 deaths
Chess grandmasters
Russian chess players
Sportspeople from Kazan